Tetragonoderus dissimilis is a species of beetle in the family Carabidae. It was described by Basilewsky in 1955.

References

dissimilis
Beetles described in 1955